Pedro Perete, ( 16108 April 1639) was a seventeenth-century Baroque engraver and painter in Madrid. He was the son, and pupil, of engraver Peter Perret. Perete Hispanicized the family name from the Dutch "Perret". Many of his works have been attributed to or confused with those by his father.

Background 
The son of Peter Perret and Isabel de Faria, it is believed he was born in Madrid in 1610, where his father was working for Philip III. In 1622, the elder Perret received from Philip IV a grant of 200 ducats "con cargo de enseñar su arte con toda perfección a un hijo suyo que ha empezado a aprenderla" ("with the charge of teaching his art with all perfection to a son of his who has begun to learn it"). His father's death in 1625 left the family impoverished as Perete and his sister Josefa had to ask the king for assistance. 

His best-known work, which he signed as an engraver, are the illustrations of Origen y dignidad de la caça (Origin and Dignity of Hunting) by Juan Mateos, printed in Madrid in 1634, with the portrait of the author on the cover. Based on that engraving, art historian Carl Justi identified Mateos as the model of an unfinished portrait of a gentleman cut below the waist painted by Velázquez, Don Juan Mateos. Other works include an equestrian portrait of the Count-Duke of Olivares and an interior illustration representing a "cloth of wild boar", executed by means of a drawing by Francisco Collantes;  prints dedicated to religious life included in the work of Juan de Palma, "Vida de la sereníssima infanta sor Margarita de la Cruz, religiosa descalza de Sta. Clara" (Life of the most serene Infanta Sister Margarita de la Cruz, barefoot nun of Sta. Clara), printed in Madrid, 1636, in the Royal Printing Office, with a front cover print representing the nun, accompanied by allegories of Pobreza and Oración, and a portrait of Philip IV, inspired by one of Velázquez's portraits of the monarch.

Of his work as a painter, only two canvases are known to exist.

His successor as the king's engraver was his pupil, .

Notes

References

Bibliography 
 
  

16th-century births
Spanish engravers
1639 deaths
17th-century Spanish painters
People from Madrid